Nurul Alam is a politician from Chittagong District of Bangladesh. He was elected a member of parliament from Chittagong-7 in February 1996.

Career 
Nurul Alam is associated with LDP politics. He was previously associated with the Bangladesh Nationalist Party. He was elected a Member of Parliament from Chittagong-7 constituency as an independent candidate in the Sixth Parliamentary Election on 15 February 1996.

He was defeated in the fifth parliamentary elections of 1991, the seventh parliamentary elections of 12 June 1996 and the 11th general elections of 2018.

References 

Living people
Year of birth missing (living people)
People from Chittagong District
Liberal Democratic Party (Bangladesh) politicians
6th Jatiya Sangsad members